Yesvantpur - Chennai Central Superfast Express is a Superfast Express train of the Indian Railways connecting Yesvantpur Junction in Karnataka and Chennai Central of Tamil Nadu. It is currently being operated with 12291/12292 train numbers on a weekly basis.

Service

The 12291/Yesvantpur-Chennai Weekly SF Express has an average speed of 55 km/h and covers 370 km in 6 hrs 50 mins. 12292/Chennai-Yesvantpur Weekly SF Express has an average speed of 55 km/h and covers 370 km in 6 hrs 50 mins.

Coach composite

The train has LHB rakes with max speed of 130 km/h. The train consists of 21 coaches:

 1 AC II Tier
 2 AC III Tier
 14 sleeper coaches
 1 general
 1 pantry car
 2 second-class luggage/parcel vans with generators

Rake sharing

The train shares its rake with 16501/16502 Yesvantpur Ahmedabad Weekly Express.

See also 

 Yesvantpur Junction railway station
 Chennai Central railway station
 Yesvantpur Ahmedabad Weekly Express

Notes

External links 

 12291/Yesvantpur-Chennai Weekly SF Express
 12292/Chennai-Yesvantpur Weekly SF Express

References 

Transport in Bangalore
Transport in Chennai
Express trains in India
Rail transport in Karnataka
Rail transport in Tamil Nadu